Vladimir Migranovich Movsisyan ( Vladimir Movsishan, 12 November 1933 in Shenavan, Spitak region, Armenia – 5 November 2014 in Yerevan, Armenia) was an Armenian politician.

He studied at Highest school of CPSU Central Committee. He ruled the agro-industry in Soviet Armenia. In 1990 he was the First Secretary of the Communist Party of Armenia the last one who officially ruled Soviet Armenia (Movsisyan was succeeded by the Chairman of the Supreme Soviet of the Republic of Armenia Levon Ter-Petrosyan).

In 1993 he administered the defence of Ijevan. In the 1990s he was the governor of Gegharkunik, then the Minister of agriculture of Armenia.

Movsisyan was also awarded the prestigious St. Mesrop Mashtots medal.

Death
Movsisyan died on 5 November 2014 in Yerevan, aged 80.

References

External links 
 Biography 

1934 births
2014 deaths
People from Lori Province
Government ministers of Armenia
Party leaders of the Soviet Union
Politburo of the Central Committee of the Communist Party of the Soviet Union members
First Secretaries of the Armenian Communist Party
Agriculture ministers of Armenia
Recipients of the Order of the Red Banner of Labour